James Walter Fraser is an American educationalist, pastor, and academic administrator. He is a professor of history and education and chair of the applied statistics, social science, and humanities department at the Steinhardt School of Culture, Education, and Human Development. Fraser is dean of education at the University of the People. He is a past president of the History of Education Society. Fraser was the pastor at Grace Church Federated from 1986 to 2006.

Education 
Fraser completed a B.A. in American History at University of California, Santa Barbara in June 1966. He earned an elementary school teaching credential in August 1968 from New York University. Fraser graduated, cum laude, in May 1970 with a M.Div. in Religious History from Union Theological Seminary. He earned a Ph.D. in the History of American Education from Columbia University in May 1975.

Career 
Fraser was a elementary school teacher at public school 76 in Manhattan from 1968 to 1970. He was a teaching assistant at Barnard College from 1970 to 1972. From 1972 to 1978, Fraser was an associate pastor at the Church of the Covenant.

Fraser was a research fellow at the Auburn Theological Seminary from 1974 to 1977. He was an assistant professor of education at Wellesley College from 1976 to 1978. Fraser was an assistant professor of religion and education from 1978 to 1984 at Boston University School of Theology. He was chair of the religion and social sciences department from 1979 to 1982.

At the University of Massachusetts Boston College of Public and Community Service Fraser, was an assistant and then associate professor from 1984 to 1990. He was director of advising from 1984 to 1987 and director of assessment from 1987 to 1990. Fraser was a senior associate in the John W. McCormack Institute for Public Affairs from 1984 to 1993. He was an adjunct associate professor in the school of education at University of Massachusetts Amherst from 1984 to 1993.

From 1986 to 2006, Fraser served as the pastor of Grace Church Federated, a United Church of Christ and Episcopal Church.

Fraser was professor of education and dean of educational studies and public policy at Lesley College from 1990 to 1993.

From 1993 to 2006, Fraser was a professor of history and education at Northeastern University. From 1993 to 1999, he was director of the center for innovation in urban education. From 1999 to 2004, Fraser was the founding dean of the Northeastern University School of Education.

Fraser joined the faculty at the Steinhardt School of Culture, Education, and Human Development in 2006 as a professor of history and education. He was senior vice president for programs of the Woodrow Wilson national fellowship foundation from 2008 to 2012. In 2015, he became chair of the department of applied statistics, social science, and humanities at Steinhardt. 

Fraser was president of the History of Education Society from 2013 to 2014.

Fraser is dean of education at the University of the People.

Personal life 
Fraser is married to Kathrine Hanson and resides in New York City. He has 4 children.

Selected works

References

External links
 

Living people
Year of birth missing (living people)
Place of birth missing (living people)
University of California, Santa Barbara alumni
Union Theological Seminary (New York City) alumni
Columbia University alumni
Wellesley College faculty
Boston University School of Theology faculty
University of Massachusetts Boston faculty
Lesley University faculty
Northeastern University faculty
Steinhardt School of Culture, Education, and Human Development faculty
University of the People faculty
Educational researchers
American historians of education
United Church of Christ ministers
20th-century American clergy
20th-century American male writers
21st-century American male writers
21st-century American clergy
Educational administrators